The  is a Japanese railway line which connects Kanaya Station in Shimada, Shizuoka Prefecture with Senzu Station in Kawanehon, Haibara District, Shizuoka Prefecture. It is owned and operated by the private railway operator Ōigawa Railway.

Stations
●: Always stops, ◇: Occasionally stops, ｜: Passes
Local Trains stop at every station

Rolling stock
, the Oigawa Main Line fleet is as follows.

Electric multiple units
 300 series 2-car EMU (former Seibu MoHa 351, stored out of use)
 420 series 2-car EMU (former Kintetsu 6421 series, stored out of use)
 3000 series 2-car EMU (former Keihan 3000 series, stored out of use)
 6000 series 2-car EMU (former Nankai 6000 series)
 7200 series 2-car EMU (former Tokyu 7200 series, purchased from Towada Electric Railway in 2015)
 16000 series 2-car EMUs x2 (former Kintetsu 16000 series)
 21000 series 2-car EMUs x2 (former Nankai 21000 series)

Electric locomotives
 Class E10 x3
 Class ED500 x1

Steam locomotives
 JNR Class C10 (C10 8)
 JNR Class C11 (C10 190/227/312)
 JNR Class C12 (C12 164, stored out of service)
 JNR Class C56 (C56 44)

In 2016, The Oigawa Railway purchased four 14 series coaches from JR Hokkaido, which were formerly used on the Hamanasu services. These coaches are scheduled to enter service on steam-hauled services on the line in June 2017, reducing the burden on the ageing heritage coaches operated by the railway.

History
The Ōigawa Main Line began operations on June 10, 1927 as a private line for the Ōigawa Electric Company, to carry workers and materials upstream to facilitate dam construction. The single-track line was extended from Kanaya in stages, reaching it current terminal station of Senzu on December 1, 1931.

The entire line was electrified on November 18, 1949, with EMUs for the passenger services commencing then and freight operation by electric- locomotives beginning in August 1951. Express train operations commenced in 1971.

The line runs through an isolated mountain area with no cities or towns, and has a very small population density. Most of the passengers are tourists visiting one of the hot spring resorts along the line, or alpinists and hikers heading for the peaks of the Southern Alps National Park. To boost ridership and popularity of the line, steam locomotives were restored from July 9, 1976. A variety of historical locomotives and carriages are used, both for the steam  and for the electric services, making the line a favourite with train enthusiasts and photographers.

Freight services ceased in 1983.

See also
 List of railway lines in Japan

References
This article incorporates material from the corresponding article in the Japanese Wikipedia.

External links 
  

Railway lines in Japan
Rail transport in Shizuoka Prefecture
Railway lines opened in 1927
1067 mm gauge railways in Japan